Friends & Strangers is the third album by American saxophonist Ronnie Laws recorded in 1976-1977 and released on the Blue Note label. The album was certified Gold by the RIAA for sales of over 500,000 copies.

Reception
The Allmusic review by Ed Hogan awarded the album three stars and stated "saxophonist Ronnie Laws' Friends and Strangers LP showcases his skilled chops on up-tempo and mellow tunes".

Track listing
All compositions by Ronnie Laws except as indicated
 "Good Time Ride" (William Jeffrey, Laws) - 5:05
 "Saturday Evening" - 4:34
 "Friends and Strangers" (Jeffrey) - 4:49
 "Nuthin' 'Bout Nuthin'" (Jeffrey, Laws) - 5:11
 "New Day" - 6:17
 "Life In Paradise" - 7:01
 "Same Old Story" - 4:41
 "Just Love" (Larry Dunn, Laws, Eloise Laws) - 3:25
Recorded at ABC Recording Studios in Los Angeles, California in January–March, 1977.

Personnel
Ronnie Laws - tenor saxophone, soprano saxophone, alto flute
Bobby Lyle - piano
Larry Dunn - synthesizer
Roland Bautista, Melvin Robinson - guitar
Donnie Beck, Nathaniel Phillips - electric bass
Steve Guttierez - drums
Vance "Mad Dog" Ternort - conga, percussion
Saundra "Pan" Alexander, Deborah Laws, Eloise Laws - backing vocals

References

Blue Note Records albums
Ronnie Laws albums
1977 albums
Albums produced by Wayne Henderson (musician)